Yumin Subdistrict is a subdistrict in Hulan District, Harbin, Heilongjiang, China. , it has 5 residential communities under its administration.

See also 
 List of township-level divisions of Heilongjiang

References 

Township-level divisions of Heilongjiang
Harbin